Vadgar is a village in Irafshan Rural District, Ashar District, Mehrestan County, Sistan and Baluchestan Province, Iran. At the 2006 census, its population was 321, in 59 families.

References 

Populated places in Mehrestan County